The family Peramuridae is a family of mammals that lived in the Late Jurassic and Early Cretaceous. They are considered to be advanced cladotherians closely related to therian mammals as part of Zatheria.

References

Cladotheria
Jurassic mammals
Prehistoric mammal families
Tithonian first appearances
Berriasian extinctions